Indianapolis Foundry was a Chrysler automobile foundry located at 1100 S. Tibbs Avenue in Indianapolis, Indiana. The factory opened in 1890 as the "American Foundry Company" and was purchased in 1946 by Chrysler and operated as a subsidiary. It became part of Chrysler property in 1946 and expanded in 1964, 1978, 1988, and went through a major remodel from 1996 through 2000. The plant covered  on Indianapolis' west side.

Brief timeline
 1890s: American Foundry opens in Indianapolis.
 1910-1920: The foundry makes engine blocks and heads for Apperson, Chalmers, Marmon, Maxwell, Stutz autos, Caterpillar tractors, Stutz fire trucks.
 1925: Maxwell reorganizes as Chrysler Corporation, turns to American Foundry as an engine block supplier.
 1946: Chrysler buys American Foundry.
 1950: New plant opens at 1100 S. Tibbs Ave.
 1964: Expansion makes Tibbs foundry Central Indiana's largest.
 1996: Foundry launches $225 million upgrade.
 2003: DaimlerChrysler says Indianapolis foundry will close within four years.
 2005: Foundry closes on September 30, idling final 900 employees.

Foundry/ Brazil S.A. The 3.3/3.8L blocks were outsourced to Bruhl Foundry/ Germany. 
Current products:
 Cast iron blocks
 3.3/3.8 L V6
 3.7 L V6
 4.7 L V8

Notes

Chrysler factories
Motor vehicle assembly plants in Indiana
Defunct companies based in Indianapolis
Manufacturing companies based in Indianapolis
1890 establishments in Indiana
2005 disestablishments in Indiana